Headed for the Future is the seventeenth studio album released by Neil Diamond in March 1986 on Columbia Records. The album  went to number 20 on the US Billboard 200. Headed for the Future has also been certified Gold in the US by the RIAA.

Overview
The album's title track reached the top 10 on the Billboard Adult Contemporary chart. Another single, "The Story of My Life", reached No. 11 on the same chart.

Track listing

Personnel

Musicians 
 Neil Diamond – main performer on all tracks

"Headed for the Future"
 Alan Lindgren – synthesizers, pianos, arrangements
 Tom Hensley – pianos, synthesizers, arrangements
 Richard Bennett – guitar
 Doug Rhone – guitar
 Hadley Hockensmith – guitar
 Reinie Press – bass
 Ron Tutt – drums
 King Errisson – percussion, congas
 Vince Charles – percussion, steel drums
 Linda Press – backing vocals
(These musicians were at the time all members of Neil Diamond's official backing band, known as "Diamondville")

"The Man You Need"
 David Foster – keyboards, arrangements
 David Boruff – keyboard programming, saxophone
 Michael Landau – guitars
 Tris Imboden – drums
 Bill Champlin – backing vocals

"I'll See You on the Radio (Laura)"
 Randy Kerber – keyboards
 Burt Bacharach – synthesizers, arrangements
 Robbie Buchanan – synthesizers 
 Todd Cochran – E-mu Emulator programming
 Dann Huff – guitars
 Neil Stubenhaus – bass
 Carlos Vega – drums
 Paulinho da Costa – percussion
 David Boruff – saxophone
 Julia Tillman Waters, Maxine Willard Waters and Stephanie Spruill – backing vocals

"Stand Up for Love"
 Greg Phillinganes – keyboards, synthesizers, backing vocals, arrangements
 Bo Tomlyn – keyboards, synthesizers
 Steve Lukather – guitars
 Nathan East – bass
 John Robinson – drums
 Maurice White – backing vocals, arrangements
 Marva Barnes – backing vocals

"It Should Have Been Me"
 David Foster – keyboards, arrangements
 David Boruff – keyboard programming
 Michael Landau – guitar
 Dann Huff – guitar
 Jason Scheff – bass, backing vocals
 Tris Imboden – drum overdubs
 Bill Champlin – backing vocals

"Lost in Hollywood"
 Stevie Wonder – acoustic piano, synthesizers, drums, backing vocals
 Herbie Hancock – synthesizer solo
 Bob Bralove and Robert A. Arbittier – synthesizer programming
 Dwayne Roberson, Vincent Unto and Phillip Williams – backing vocals

"The Story of My Life"
 Lists the same musicians here as were listed for the "Headed for the Future" track; obviously, not all of those musicians performed on this track as well.  It is possible that Diamond himself might have performed some of the instrumentation (such as piano and/or acoustic guitar) uncredited.

"Angel"
 Greg Phillinganes – keyboards, synthesizers, arrangements
 Bo Tomlyn – keyboards, synthesizers
 Nyle Steiner – additional synthesizer
 Bobby Caldwell – guitar, backing vocals
 Dann Huff – additional guitar
 Neil Stubenhaus – bass
 John Robinson – drums
 Paulinho da Costa – percussion
 Maurice White – backing vocals, arrangements

"Me Beside You"
 Randy Kerber – keyboards
 Burt Bacharach– synthesizers, arrangements
 David Foster – synthesizers
 Dann Huff – guitars
 Neil Stubenhaus – bass
 Carlos Vega – drums
 Paulinho da Costa – percussion
 Julia Tillman Waters, Maxine Willard Waters, Stephanie Spruill and David Lasley – backing vocals

"Love Doesn't Live Here Anymore"
 Greg Phillinganes – keyboards, synthesizers, arrangements
 Bo Tomlyn – keyboards, synthesizers
 Bobby Caldwell – guitar
 Dann Huff – additional guitar
 Neil Stubenhaus – bass
 John Robinson – drums
 Paulinho da Costa – percussion
 Clare Fischer – string arrangements
 Maurice White – arrangements
 Assa Drori – concertmaster

Production 
 Producers – Neil Diamond (Tracks 1 & 7); Tom Henley and Alan Lindgren (Track 1); David Foster (Tracks 2 & 5); Burt Bacharach and Carole Bayer Sager (Tracks 3 & 9); Maurice White and Greg Phillinganes (Tracks 4, 8); Stevie Wonder (Track 6).
 Recording Engineers – John Arrias, Humberto Gatica, Mick Guzauski, John Patterson, Tom Perry,  David Schober and Allen Sides.
 Assistant Engineers – Bino Espinoza, Dan Garcia, Bob Harlan, Darren Klein, Bob Loftus, Steve MacMillan, Richard McKernon, Claudio Ordenes, Mike Ross, Karen Siegel and Jeffrey Woodruff.
 Mixing – Bill Bottrell, Humberto Gatica, Mick Guzauski, Gary Olazabal and Allen Sides.
 Recorded at Ocean Way Recording, Bill Schnee Studios, Motown Recording Studios, Lion Share Recording Studio and Wonderland Studios (Los Angeles, CA); Conway Studios and Soundcastle (Hollywood, CA); Chartmaker Studios (Malibu, CA); Grover Helseley Recording Inc. 
 Mastered by Bernie Grundman at Bernie Grundman Mastering (Hollywood, CA).
 Music Contractor – Frank DeCaro
 Production Assistants – Ned Brown, Barry Cardinale, Larry E. Williams and Alison Zanetos. 
 Production Coordination – Sam Cole, Frank DeCaro, Chris Earthy and Geri White.
 Art Direction – David Kirschner
 Design – David Kirschner and Jan Weinberg
 Photography – Herb Ritts

Charts

References

Neil Diamond albums
1986 albums
Albums produced by David Foster
Albums produced by Burt Bacharach
Albums produced by Maurice White
Albums produced by Stevie Wonder
Columbia Records albums